Lac du Bonnet is a provincial electoral division in the Canadian province of Manitoba.  It was created by redistribution in 1957, and has formally existed since the provincial election of 1958.  It is a relatively large constituency, located to the northeast of Winnipeg.

Lac du Bonnet is bordered to the west by Selkirk and Springfield, to the south by La Verendrye, to the north by Rupertsland and to the east by the Ontario border.  Communities in the riding include Lac Du Bonnet, Pinawa, Beausejour (known as the birthplace of Edward Schreyer) and Whitemouth.

The riding is currently regarded as a Progressive Conservative/New Democratic Party marginal.  The Tories have held the seat since 1988, though they retained it by only a narrow majority in 2003.

Demographics
The riding's population in 1996 was 20,035.  In 1999, the average family income was $45,693, and the unemployment rate was 9.00%.  There are a number of diverse economic communities in the riding, including farming, forestry and nuclear research.  The service sector accounted for 12% of the riding's industry in 1999, followed by 10% in health and social services.

Lac Du Bonnet is an ethnically diverse riding.  Eighteen per cent of the riding's residents are aboriginal, along with 9% German and 6% Ukrainian.  Six per cent of the riding's residents are francophone.

List of provincial representatives
This riding has elected the following MLAs:

Electoral results

1958 general election

1959 general election

1962 general election

1966 general election

1969 general election

1973 general election

1977 general election

1981 general election

1986 general election

1988 general election

1990 general election

1995 general election

1999 general election

2002 by-election

2003 general election

2007 general election

2011 general election

2016 general election

2019 general election

Previous boundaries

References

Manitoba provincial electoral districts